The Ukvushvuynen Range, also known as Meingypilgyn Range, is a range of mountains in Chukotka Autonomous Okrug, Russian Far East. Administratively the range is part of Anadyr District.

Geography
The Ukvushvuynen Range is the easternmost subrange of the Koryak Highlands, East Siberian Mountains. It stretches roughly from east to west in southern Chukotka, between the Koyverelan Range to the west and Cape Navarin in the Bering Sea to the east. To the northwest rises the Rarytkin Range and the Velikaya River flows into the Anadyr Lowlands. To the southwest stretches the Komeutyuyam Range.

The highest mountains of the Ukvushvuynen Range are located in its western part. Lakes Vaamochka and Pekulney are coastal lagoons that lie on the southern side of the range. 

The range has 28 mountain glaciers. The Kakanaut River, a small river flowing southwards in the central part of the range into the NE bay of Lake Pekulney, gives its name to the Kakanaut Maastrichtian geological formation.

Flora and climate
There are shrub areas of Siberian pine in the lower mountain slopes, while the upper elevations are covered with mountain tundra. The Ukvushvuynen Range has a subarctic climate, somewhat moderated by the proximity of the ocean. Very little precipitation falls in winter in the form of snow, most falls as rain in the summer.

Bibliography
Elizabeth L. Miller, Arthur Grantz, Simon Klemperer eds. - Tectonic Evolution of the Bering Shelf-Chukchi Sea-Arctic Margin and Adjacent Landmasses

See also
Kakanaut Formation

References

External links
Pekulney Lake
Hydrometeorology and hydrochemistry of the seas (p. 2)
Koryak Mountains
Mountain ranges of Chukotka Autonomous Okrug
Landforms of Siberia